The 22nd National Hockey League All-Star Game was held in the Montreal Forum in Montreal, home of the Stanley Cup champion Montreal Canadiens, on January 21, 1969. The East Division All-Stars tied the West Division All-Stars 3–3. This was the first All-Star Game played under a divisional format, and the final All-Star Game to end in a tie. Frank Mahovlich was named the game's most valuable player.

League business
After governor discussions at the concurrent semi-annual meeting, Clarence Campbell, president of the NHL, gave the Oakland Seals one month to come up with proper financing and improve its management to be allowed to continue play.

Uniforms
The East Division All-Stars continued to wear the uniforms worn by the NHL All-Stars since 1964. The only change to the uniform was the addition of the player's name on the back. As the NHL continued to reuse the actual sweaters from previous All-Star Games, the addition of names necessitated a large nameplate to cover the stars on the back of the jersey. The names were displayed in black letters with orange outlines.

For the West Division, new uniforms were created, following the same basic design as the existing uniforms, but in navy blue with orange and white trim. The player numbers were rendered in orange with a triple outline of navy-white-orange, in contrast to the East uniforms which continued to use plain black numbers. The names were displayed in white letters with orange outlines.

The East Division uniforms would receive a slight update in 1971, while the West uniforms remained unchanged through 1972.

The game

Summary

Source: Podnieks

Team lineups 
Al Arbour made his debut in the All-Star Game at age 36, the eldest to debut in the game to that date. Toe Blake, who had retired after the Canadiens' championship, came out of retirement to coach the East Division.

See also
1968–69 NHL season

References

 

All-Star Games
National Hockey League All-Star Games
National Hockey League All-Star Game
1960s in Montreal
1969 in Quebec
Ice hockey competitions in Montreal